Flectonotus pygmaeus (also known as: Puerto Cabello treefrog) is a species of frog in the family Hemiphractidae. It is found on the Mérida Andes and Venezuelan Coastal Range in Venezuela and on adjacent eastern slopes of the northern Cordillera Oriental in Colombia.
Its natural habitat is humid pre-montane forest. It is strongly associated with bromeliads, and can survive in degraded forest if bromeliads are present.
It is threatened by deforestation, and locally, collection of bromeliads.

References

Flectonotus
Amphibians of the Andes
Amphibians of Colombia
Amphibians of Venezuela
Taxa named by Oskar Boettger
Amphibians described in 1893
Taxonomy articles created by Polbot